Sarah Townsend, known professionally as Sarah McGuinness, is a British singer, composer, producer, director, and screenwriter.

Sarah Townsend may also refer to: 

 Sarah Townsend (spy), an informant of the Culper Ring
Sarah Townsend, wife of Buchanan Winthrop

See also
Sarah, Marchioness Townshend